The Arve River is a river in the southeast region of Tasmania, Australia.

The river rises below Devils Backbone in the Hartz Mountains and flows generally north towards the Arve Plains. It reaches its confluence with the Huon River west of Huonville. The river descends  over its  course.

See also

List of rivers of Tasmania

References

Rivers of Tasmania
Southern Tasmania